This is an order of battle of the Chilean Army.

Office of the Army Commander in Chief in Santiago, the Army's headquarters city where it is situated
 Military Scenarios and Investigations Center
 Office of the Army Secretary General
 Office of the Army Auditor General

Army General Staff Office (Estado Mayor General del Ejército)
 Finance Directorate
 Logistics
 Intelligence Directorate
 Projects Department

Ground Operations Command
Army Ground Operations Command, headquartered in Concepcion, the base garrison of the Chacabuco 6th Infantry Regiment

I Division 

Responsible for the defense of the Antofagasta and Atacama regions.

 I Division, in Antofagasta
 1st Motorized Brigade "Calama" (Brigada Motorizada Nº 1 "Calama") in Calama
 15th Motorized Infantry Battalion "Calama", (Batallón de Infantería Motorizado Nº 15 "Calama")
 10th Artillery Group "Borgoño", (Grupo de Artillería Nº 10 "Borgoño")
 1st Engineer Battalion "Atacama", (Batallón de Ingenieros Nº 1 "Atacama")
 Armored Squadron, (Escuadrón Blindado)
 Garrison Unit, (Unidad de Cuartel)
 3rd Armored Brigade "La Concepción", (Brigada Acorazada Nº 3 "La Concepción") in Antofagasta
 7th Armored Infantry Battalion "Esmeralda" (Batallón de Infantería Blindada Nº 7 "Esmeralda")
 8th Armored Group "Exploradores" (Grupo Blindado Nº 8 "Exploradores")
 5th Self-propelled Artillery Group "Antofagasta" (Grupo de Artillería Autopropulsada Nº 5 "Antofagasta")
 10th Mechanized Engineer Company "Pontoneros", (Compañía de Ingenieros Mecanizada Nº 10 "Pontoneros")
 7th Signal Company "San Pedro de Atacama", (Compañía de Telecomunicaciones Nº 7 "San Pedro de Atacama")
 Armored Reconnaissance Platoon (Pelotón de Exploración Blindado)
 23rd Infantry Regiment "Copiapo" (Regimiento Nº 23 "Copiapó") in Copiapó
 Motorized Infantry Battalion
 Anti-tank Company
 1st Divisional Logistic Regiment "Tocopilla", (Regimiento Logístico Divisionario Nº 1 "Tocopilla") in Antofagasta
 1st Signals Battalion "El Loa", (Batallón de Telecomunicaciones Nº 1 "El Loa")
 1st Aviation Platoon "Antofagasta" (Pelotón de Aviación Nº 1 "Antofagasta")in Antofagasta

II Motorized Division 

Responsible for the defense of the Coquimbo, Valparaíso, Santiago, O'Higgins, Maule, and Ñuble regions.

 II Motorized Division, in Santiago
 2nd Motorized Brigade "Maipo" (Brigada Motorizada Nº 2 "Maipo") in Valparaíso
 1st Infantry Regiment "Buin", (Regimiento de Infanteria Nº 1 "Buin") in Recoleta
 Mechanized Infantry Battalion
 Anti-tank Company
 2nd Infantry Regiment "Maipo" ( Regimiento Nº 2 "Maipo") in Valparaiso
 Motorized Infantry Battalion
 Anti-tank Company
 19th Infantry Regiment "Colchagua" (Regimiento Nº 19 "Colchagua") in San Fernando
 Motorized Infantry Battalion
 Anti-tank Company
 1st Artillery (Training) Regiment "Tacna" (Regimiento de Artillería Nº 1 "Tacna") in San Bernardo
 1st Artillery Group "Tacna", (Grupo de Artillería Nº 1 "Tacna")
 State Horse Artillery Battery
 6th Motorized Brigade "Maule" (Brigada Motorizada Nº 6 "Maule") in Concepción
 6th Infantry Regiment "Chacabuco" (Regimiento Nº 6 "Chacabuco") in Concepción
 Motorized Infantry Battalion
 3rd Artillery Group "Silva Renard" (Grupo de Artillería Nº 3 "Silva Renard")
 3rd Motorized Signal Company "Curicó" (Compañía de Telecomunicaciones Motorizada Nº 3 "Curicó")
 Historical Company
 9th Infantry Regiment "Chillán" (Regimiento Nº 9 "Chillán") in Chillán
 Motorized Infantry Battalion
 Anti-tank Company
 16th Infantry Regiment "Talca" (Regimiento Nº 16 "Talca") in Talca
 Motorized Infantry Battalion
 Anti-tank Company
 21st Infantry Regiment "Coquimbo", (Regimiento Nº 21 "Coquimbo") in La Serena
 Motorized Infantry Battalion
 Anti-tank Company

III Mountain Division 

Responsible for the defense of the Biobío, Los Lagos, Araucanía, and Los Ríos regions, especially in the mountains in the country's eastern borders.

 III Mountain Division, in Valdivia
 3rd Mountain Detachment "Yungay", (Destacamento de Montaña Nº 3 "Yungay") in Los Andes
 18th Andean Infantry Battalion "Guardia Vieja", (Batallón de Infantería Andino Nº 18 "Guardia Vieja")
 2nd Mountain Artillery Battery "Arica", (Batería de Artillería de Montaña Nº 2 "Arica")
 2nd Mountain Engineer Company "Puente Alto", (Compañía de Ingenieros de Montaña Nº 2 "Puente Alto")
 Mounted Mountain Reconnaissance Platoon, (Pelotón de Exploración Montado de Montaña)
 Signal Section "Los Andes", (Sección de Telecomunicaciones "Los Andes")
 8th Mountain Detachment "Tucapel", (Destacamento de Montaña Nº 8 "Tucapel") in Temuco 
 8th Mountain Infantry Battalion "Frontera" (Batallón de Infantería de Montaña Nº 8 "Frontera")
 Mountain Artillery Battery, (Batería de Artillería de Montaña)
 Mountain Engineer Company, (Compañía de Ingenieros de Montaña)
 Signal Section, (Sección de Telecomunicaciones)
 9th Mountain Detachment "Arauco", (Destacamento de Montaña Nº 9 "Arauco") in Osorno
 13th Mountain Infantry Battalion "Andalién", (Batallón de Infantería de Montaña Nº 13 "Andalién")
 4th Motorized Engineer Battalion "Arauco" (Batallón de Ingenieros Motorizados Nº 4 "Arauco")
 Mountain Artillery Battery, (Batería de Artillería de Montaña)
 Signal Section, (Sección de Telecomunicaciones)
 Garrison Unit, (Unidad de Cuartel)
 17th Mountain Detachment "Los Ángeles", (Destacamento de Montaña Nº 17 "Los Ángeles") in Los Ángeles
 17th Mountain Infantry Battalion "Tarpellanca" (Batallón de Infantería de Montaña Nº 17 "Tarpellanca")
 16th Mountain Artillery Battery "Carvallo", (Batería de Artillería de Montaña Nº 16 "Carvallo")
 3rd Mountain Engineer Company "Los Ángeles", (Compañía de Ingenieros de Montaña Nº 3 "Los Ángeles")
 Signal Section, (Sección de Telecomunicaciones)
 Garrison Unit (Unidad de Cuartel)
 3rd Cavalry Regiment (Mountain) "Hussars" (Regimiento de Caballería Nº 3 "Húsares") in Angol
 Mounted Group "Húsares", (Grupo Montado "Húsares")
 3rd Divisional Logistic Regiment "Victoria", (Regimiento Logístico Divisionario Nº 3 "Victoria") in Victoria
 4th Signal Battalion "Membrillar", (Batallón de Telecomunicaciones Nº 4 "Membrillar") in Valdivia
 13th Commando Company "Escorpión", (Compañía de Comandos Nº 13 "Escorpión") in Valdivia
 3rd Intelligence Company, (Compañía de Inteligencia Nº 3) in Valdivia
 3rd Aviation Platoon "Valdivia", (Pelotón de Aviación Nº 3 "Valdivia") in Valdivia

IV Division 

Responsible for the defense of the Aysén region.

 IV Division, in Coyhaique
 14th Motorized Detachment "Aysén", (Destacamento Motorizado Nº 14 "Aysén") in Coyhaique
 26th Motorized Infantry Battalion "Aysén", (Batallón de Infantería Motorizado Nº 26 "Aysén")
 8th Artillery Group "San Carlos de Ancud", (Grupo de Artillería N° 8 "San Carlos de Ancud")
 Anti-tank Company
 8th Divisional Signal Company "Coyhaique", (Compañía de Telecomunicaciones Divisionaria Nº 8 "Coyhaique")
 8th Engineers Regiment "Chiloé" (Regimiento Nº 8 "Chiloé") in Puerto Aysén
 Engineer Battalion
 Mountain Reconnaissance Squadron "Chaitén", (Escuadrón de Exploración Montado "Chaitén") in Chaitén
 20th Andean Company "Cochrane", (Compañía Andina Nº 20 "Cochrane")
 4th Aviation Platoon "Aysén", (Pelotón de Aviación Nº 4 "Aysén")

V Division 

Responsible for the defense of the Magallanes region, which includes the world's southernmost city of Punta Arenas.

 V Army Division, in Punta Arenas
 4th Armored Brigade "Chorrillos", (Brigada Acorazada Nº 4 "Chorrillos) in Punta Arenas
 6th Armored Group "Dragoons" (Grupo Blindado Nº 6 "Dragones")
 25th Mechanized Infantry Battalion "El Roble" (Batallón de Infantería Mecanizado Nº 25 "El Roble")
 7th Artillery Group "Wood", (Grupo de Artillería Nº 7 "Wood")
 11th Mechanized Engineer Company "Tehuelches", (Compañía de Ingenieros Mecanizados Nº 11 "Tehuelches")
 Armored Reconnaissance Platoon (Pelotón de Exploración Blindado)
 Air Defense Artillery Platoon (Pelotón de Artillería Antiaérea)
 5th Armored Detachment "Lancers" (Destacamento Acorazado Nº 5 "Lanceros") in Puerto Natales
 5th Armored Squadron "Lancers" (Escuadrón Blindado Nº 5 "Lanceros")
 Mechanized Infantry Company (Compañía de Infantería Mecanizada)
 12th Artillery Group "Magallanes" (Grupo de Artillería Nº 12 "Magallanes")
 10th Infantry Regiment "Pudeto" (Regimiento Nº 10 "Pudeto") in Punta Arenas
 10th Motorized Infantry Battalion, "Pudeto" (Batallón de Infantería Motorizada Nº 10 "Pudeto")
 5th Engineer Battalion "Punta Arenas", (Batallón de Ingenieros Nº 5 "Punta Arenas")
 5th Signal Battalion "Patagonia", (Batallón de Telecomunicaciones Nº 5 "Patagonia")
 Anti-tank Company "Pelantaru", (Compañía Antiblindaje "Pelantaru")
 5th Commando Company "Lientur", (Compañía de Comandos Nº 5 "Lientur")
 11th Motorized Detachment "Caupolicán", (Destacamento Motorizado Nº 11 "Caupolicán") in Isla Grande de Tierra del Fuego
 11th Infantry Battalion "Caupolicán" (Batallón de Infantería Nº 11 "Caupolicán")
 13th Artillery Group "Tierra Del Fuego" (Grupo de Artillería Nº 13 "Tierra del Fuego")
 Anti-tank Company, (Compañía Antiblindaje)
 Logistic Company, (Compañía Logística)
 5th Divisional Logistic Regiment "Magallanes", (Regimiento Logístico Divisionario Nº 5 "Magallanes") in Punta Arenas
 5th Aviation Platoon "Punta Arenas", (Pelotón de Aviación Nº 5 "Punta Arenas")
 Antarctic Studies Center of the Army, (Centro de Estudios Antárticos del Ejército)
 Army Base "Gen. Bernardo O'Higgins", (Base del Ejército "Gen. Bernardo O'Higgins")

VI Division 

Responsible for the defense of the Arica y Parinacota and Tarapacá regions.

 VI Division, in Iquique
 1st Armored Brigade "Cuirassiers" (Brigada Acorazada Nº 1 "Coraceros") in Arica
 27th Armored Infantry Battalion "Bulnes", (Batallón de Infantería Blindado Nº 27 "Bulnes")
 9th Armored Group "Vencedores", (Grupo Blindado Nº 9 "Vencedores")
 4th Self-propelled Artillery Group "Miraflores", (Grupo de Artillería Autopropulsada Nº 4 "Miraflores")
 Anti-tank Company, (Compañía Antiblindaje)
 Anti-air Artillery Battery, (Batería de Artillería Antiaérea)
 9th Mechanized Engineer Company "Zapadores", (Compañía de Ingenieros Mecanizada Nº 9 "Zapadores")
 10th Signal Company "San Marcos de Arica", (Compañía de Telecomunicaciones Nº 10 "San Marcos de Arica")
 Supply and Maintenance Company, (Compañía de Abastecimiento y Mantenimiento)
 Armored Reconnaissance Platoon, (Pelotón de Exploración Blindado)
 2nd Armored Brigade "Mounted Rifles" (Brigada Acorazada Nº 2 "Cazadores") in Pozo Almonte
 5th Armored Infantry Battalion "Carampangue", (Batallón de Infantería Blindado Nº 5 "Carampangue")
 7th Armored Group "Guías", (Grupo Blindado Nº 7 "Guías")
 9th Self-propelled Artillery Group "Salvo", (Grupo de Artillería Autopropulsada Nº 9 "Salvo")
 7th Mechanized Engineer Company "Aconcagua", (Compañía de Ingenieros Mecanizada Nº 7 "Aconcagua")
 11th Signal Company "Huara", (Compañía de Telecomunicaciones Nº 11 "Huara")
 Armored Reconnaissance Platoon, (Pelotón de Exploración Blindado)
 Supply and Maintenance Company, (Compañía de Abastecimiento y Mantenimiento)
 4th Motorized Brigade "Rancagua" (Brigada Motorizada Nº 4 "Rancagua") in Arica
 4th Motorized Infantry Battalion "Rancagua", (Batallón de Infantería Motorizada Nº 4 "Rancagua")
 6th Artillery Group "Dolores", (Grupo de Artillería Nº 6 "Dolores")
 6th Engineer Battalion "Azapa", (Batallón de Ingenieros Nº 6 "Azapa")
 Signal Company (Compañía de Telecomunicaciones)
 Historical Company 
 24th Motorized Brigade "Huamachuco", (Brigada Motorizada Nº 24 "Huamachuco") in Putre
 24th Motorized Infantry Battalion "Huamachuco", (Batallón de Infantería Motorizada Nº 24 "Huamachuco")
 14th Artillery Group "Parinacota", (Grupo de Artillería Nº 14 "Parinacota")
 Reconnaissance Platoon, (Pelotón de Exploración Terrestre)
 Anti-tank Company, (Compañía Antiblindaje)
 Engineer Company, (Compañía de Ingenieros)
 Signal Company, (Compañía de Telecomunicaciones)
 Logistic Company, (Compañía Logística)
 6th Divisional Logistic Regiment "Pisagua", (Regimiento Logístico Divisionario Nº 6 "Pisagua") in Arica
 6th Signal Battalion "Tarapacá", (Batallón de Telecomunicaciones N° 6 "Tarapacá") in Pozo Almonte
 1st Commando Company "Iquique", (Compañía de Comandos Nº 1 "Iquique") in Iquique
 6th Aviation Platoon "Arica", (Pelotón de Aviación Nº 6 "Arica") in Arica

Special Operations Brigade 

 Special Operations Brigade "Lautaro", (Brigada de Operaciones Especiales "Lautaro") in Peldehue
 1st Paratroopers Battalion "Pelantaru", (Batallón de Paracaidistas Nº 1 "Pelantaru")
 Army Special Forces Group, (Agrupación de Fuerzas Especiales del Ejército)
 Mountain Special Group, (Agrupación Especial de Montaña)
 Paratroopers and Special Forces School, (Escuela de Paracaidistas y Fuerzas Especiales)
 12th Commando Company, (Compañía de Comandos Nº 12)
 Logistic Company, (Compañía Logística)

Army Aviation Brigade 

 Army Aviation Brigade, (Brigada de Aviación) in Rancagua
 Fixed-Wing Aircraft Battalion "La Independencia" (Batallón de Aviones "La Independencia")
 Rotatory-Wing Aircraft Battalion "Germania" (Batallón de Helicópteros "Germania")
 Aviation Maintenance and Supply Battalion (Batallón Mantenimiento y Abastecimiento de Aviación)
 Airport Company (Compañía Aeropuerto)
 5x Aviation platoons detached to each army division

Doctrine Command
Army Institution and Doctrine Command (Commando Instituto y Doctrina)
 Army Schools Division (Division Escuelas)
 Bernardo O'Higgins Military Academy in Las Condes
 Army NCO School Sergeant Daniel Rebolledo Sepulveda in Maipú
 Army War College in La Reina
 Military Polytechnical Academy in La Reina
 Army Infantry School General Jose de San Martin in San Bernardo
 Army Communications School in Peñalolen
 Army Engineering School in San Antonio
 Army Services and Physical Education School in La Reina
 Army Airborne and Special Forces School in Peldehue
 Army Mountain School in Rio Blanco 
 Army Education Division (Division de Educacion)
 Army Doctrine Division (Division de Doctrina)

Force Support Command
Army Force Support Services Command (Commando Apoyo de la Fuerza)

  Army Logistic Division, (División Logística del Ejército) in Santiago 
 1st Logistic Regiment "Bellavista"(Regimiento Logístico de Ejército Nº 1 "Bellavista") in Conchalí 
 2nd Logistic Regiment "Arsenales de Guerra", (Regimiento Logístico de Ejército Nº 2 "Arsenales de Guerra") in Peldehue
 3rd Logistic Regiment "Limache", (Regimiento Logístico de Ejército Nº 3 "Limache") in Renca
 Army Engineering Command (Commando de Ingenieros)
 Military Workers Corps
 Army Engineering Service
 Army Communications Command
 Army Infrastructure Command
 Army Military Engineering and Industry Command
 FAMAE Arms Factory in Talagante
 Military Geography Institute in Santiago
 Investigation and Control Institute in Santiago

General Garrison Command
Army General Garrison Command in Santiago, serving the Santiago Metropolitan Region, reports directly to Army Headquarters
 1st Cavalry (Horse Guards) Regiment "Grenadiers" (Regimiento Escolta Presidencial Nº1 "Granaderos") in Quillota, the former headquarters of the Army Armored Cavalry School, also functions as the Presidential Escort Regiment since 1840. Name attributes to the Argentine Regiment of Mounted Grenadiers "Gen. Jose De San Martin" and Ecuador's Tarqui Grenadiers and Tapi Grenadiers Regiments
 Mounted Ceremonial Squadron
 Honors Squadron
 Training Center 
 1st Military Police Regiment "Santiago" (Regimiento de Policía Militar N1º "Santiago")

Army Medical Command
 Army Medical Command in Santiago
 Santiago Military Hospital (Hospital Militar de Santiago)
 Northern Military Hospital in Antofagasta
 Children's Rehabilitation Center
 Army Administration Command

Graphic overview of the Chilean Army

Geographic distribution of operational forces

Unit names
All infantry units and most of the artillery regiments are named after important battles or places in Chile, while the cavalry regiments are named after the various types of cavalry. These are the units:

 1st Infantry: Battle of Buin Bridge
 2nd Infantry: Battle of Maipu
 8th Infantry: Battle of Tucapel
 12th Infantry: Battle of Sangra
 21st Infantry: Battle of Copiapo
 24th Infantry: Battle of Huamachuco
 3rd Mountain: Battle of Yungay
 4th Brigade: Battle of Rancagua
 6th Infantry: Battle of Chacabuco
 17th Reinforced: Battle of Los Angeles
 3rd Brigade: Battle of La Concepcion
 1st Cavalry: Horse Grenadiers
 3rd Cavalry: Hussars
 5th Cavalry: Lancers
 8th Cavalry: Scouts/Explorers
 1st Armored Brigade: Cuirassiers
 2nd Armored Brigade: Horse Rifleman/Horse Rifle Hunter
 6th ACG: Dragoons
 1st Artillery: Battle of Tacna
 2nd Artillery: Battle of Arica
 4th Artillery: Battle of Miraflores
 8th Artillery: Battle of San Carlos de Ancud
 Helicopter Battalion: Battle of Pampa Germania
 8th Engineer: Battle of Chiloé

References

Adrian J. English, Armed Forces of Latin America
Jane's World Armies
Jane's Sentinel

:es:Anexo:Organización del Ejército de Chile

Chilean Army
Chilean Army